Eroor is a suburb of the city of Kochi in the state of Kerala, India. It is located at around 7 km from the city center.

Temples
Puthenkulangara Shiva Temple of Eroor is known for its green surroundings and garden, which contains dozens of flowers and fruit trees.

Demographics
 India census, Eroor had a population of 18,680 with 9,023 males and 9,657 females.

References

Villages in Ernakulam district